is a former Japanese football player.

Career

College
Nishimura attended Kokushikan University in Setagaya, Tokyo from 1997 to 2000, winning the All-Japan Prime Minister Cup.

Professional
Nishimura began his professional career with J1 League sides Urawa Reds, but never made a league appearance for the team which finished the 2004 season in second place in J1 League. He transferred to Urawa's cross-town rivals Omiya Ardija, helping the club achieve promotion from J2 League into J1 League in 2004. He became a regular player as right side back and the club won the 2nd place and was promoted to J2 from 2005. Although his opportunity to play decreased in 2006, he became a regular player again in 2007. However he could hardly play in the match in 2008.

Nishimura signed for Portland Timbers of the USL First Division in April 2009. On February 11, 2010 Crystal Palace Baltimore announced the signing of Nishimura to a contract for the 2010 season.

In 2011, he returned to Japan and joined J2 club Consadole Sapporo. However he could hardly play in the match and retired end of 2011 season.

National team
Nishimura was a part of Japan’s youth national team system, competing at the U-14 level, but has never been called up to the senior Japan national team.

Club statistics

Playing style
Small in size but intelligent wide flank utility player on and off the ball, Nishimura's constant timely and tireless overlaps creates a wider variety of attacking options for the team.  His accurate crosses also provides many scoring opportunities.

Honors

Portland Timbers
USL First Division Commissioner's Cup (1): 2009

References

External links

 Portland Timbers bio
 Crystal Palace Baltimore bio

1977 births
Living people
Kokushikan University alumni
Association football people from Tokyo
Japanese footballers
Japanese expatriate footballers
J1 League players
J2 League players
USL First Division players
USSF Division 2 Professional League players
Urawa Red Diamonds players
Omiya Ardija players
Portland Timbers (2001–2010) players
Crystal Palace Baltimore players
Hokkaido Consadole Sapporo players
Association football defenders
Japanese expatriate sportspeople in the United States
Expatriate soccer players in the United States